Acremodontina poutama is a species of sea snail, a marine gastropod mollusk in the family Trochaclididae, the false top snails.

Distribution
This marine species is endemic to New Zealand (off Steward Island, Snares Islands and Otago)

References

 Powell A. W. B., New Zealand Mollusca, William Collins Publishers Ltd, Auckland, New Zealand 1979 
 Marshall, B.A. (1995). Recent and Tertiary Trochaclididae from the Southwest Pacific (Mollusca: Gastropoda: Trochoidea). The Veliger. 38 : 92–115

External links
 To World Register of Marine Species

poutama
Gastropods described in 1962